Abbott M. Washburn (March 1, 1915 – December 11, 2003) was an American administrator who served as a Commissioner of the Federal Communications Commission from 1974 to 1982.

He died of a stroke on December 11, 2003, in Washington, D.C. at age 88.

References

1915 births
2003 deaths
Members of the Federal Communications Commission
Minnesota Republicans
Nixon administration personnel
Ford administration personnel
Carter administration personnel
Reagan administration personnel